Emek Golan, known professionally as Emek, is an American designer, illustrator and fine art painter. He was called "The Thinking Man’s Poster Artist" by punk-rock singer Henry Rollins while working on the album cover for A Rollins in the Wry.

Career
Since 2009, Emek's work has been shown in galleries across the United States, in Berlin, London and Tokyo.

He has painted album covers for Neil Young, Pearl Jam and singer/songwriter Erykah Badu. His work for Badu included the art and packaging for New Amerykah in 2008, voted #12 of the Top 20 Album Covers of All Time by Virgin Media.

Emek's unique visual style has graced music posters on a diverse musical spectrum, from blues legend B.B. King to Queens of the Stone Age, Coachella Music & Arts Festival and, most recently, by astrophysicist Neil deGrasse Tyson. He was invited to exhibit at the opening of the Rock and Roll Hall of Fame and Museum "History of Rock Posters" exhibition in Cleveland, Ohio. The museum cites Emek as an "internationally recognized poster artist" and has a collection of 37 Emek posters for various concerts and festivals from 2004–2012 in its Library and Archives.

Shelley Leopold of LA Weekly wrote: "Emek helped usher back the popularity of rock poster art.  He perhaps reminded us of its cultural importance, right on the heels of iTunes and the impending disappearance of 'the album cover."

"It seemed most appropriate to the way I draw," Emek said. "Collectors don't necessarily ask me for something from a particular band; they might ask for a big robot."

Career beginnings
His first poster commission was in 1992, for a unity rally and concert after the Rodney King verdict on Martin Luther King Day in Los Angeles. The poster was part of a grassroots effort and benefit to acknowledge the acquittal of the Rodney King verdict, and also bring healing to the riots that followed. The image—a scratchboard visage of Martin Luther King Jr. rising above a concert crowd—was stapled to the city's burnt-out buildings. It is speculated that no copies of this poster exist today.

Emek's poster-making career accelerated in the late 1990s with art for alternative rock acts from Europe and North America, including Pearl Jam, Radiohead, Queens of the Stone Age, Tool, and Marilyn Manson. Some earlier works were painted acrylic art on canvas from which limited edition litho posters were made. One such example is the 1998 litho for the Beastie Boys Portland Rose Garden (2 August) and Oakland Coliseum (13, 14 September 1998) shows.

Philanthropy
Emek created a poster to promote the Music for Relief "Tsunami Benefit Gig" on February 18, 2005 at Arrowhead Pond in Anaheim, CA, USA. His poster, along with performances by No Doubt, Linkin Park, Jay-Z, Ozzy Osbourne, Blink-182, Rob Zombie, The Crystal Method and Jurassic 5, helped to raise over one million dollars for UNICEF and Habitat for Humanity. Music for Relief's Brad Delson thanked Emek for his contribution, stating that the money raised would be used to fund "vital projects in South Asia, as part of the long-term effort to rebuild those areas" affected by the December 2004 disaster.

Following the Tuesday, 12 January 2010 Haiti earthquake, Emek released a limited-edition, 7-color silkscreen print with hand-illustrated type that simply reads, "Haiti". All profits, totaling $24,000, from the poster sale were donated equally to Partners in Health, Mercy Corps and Doctors Without Borders for the Haiti Earthquake Relief on February 3, 2010.

At 12pm PST May 23, 2013 Pangea Seed released the fourth print release of the 2013 print-suite "Sea of Change: The Year of Living Dangerously". Emek's edition titled "There Is Only One", a 5-color silk screen print with [metallic and glow-in-the-dark] inks, was printed on both special blue paper and glitter foil paper. The combined sales of the art prints with variant edition raised almost $10,000 toward the conservation, awareness and education of the Whale Shark (the subject of his art).

Emek made a special limited-edition silkscreen poster for The Rock Poster Society (TRPS) that raised $15,000 towards TRPS Artist Relief Trust. The organization uses the fund to assist poster artists who may be going through a rough patch in their lives.

References

Album-cover and concert-poster artists
American illustrators
American graphic designers
Psychedelic artists
American poster artists
1970 births
Living people